The Antioch Unified School District serves approximately 17,000 students in the city of Antioch, California, and a portion of the neighboring city of Oakley.

History
The Antioch Unified School District was formed in 1921 from the Antioch and Live Oak school districts. Formal education in Antioch began in 1850, in a converted ship's galley, with a 12-year-old girl as the sole teacher.

Schools

High schools
Antioch High School 
Deer Valley High School
Dozier-Libbey Medical High School
Live Oak High School
Bidwell Continuation High School
Prospects High School/Alternative Education
Riverview Union High School (closed 1931)

Middle schools
Antioch Middle School
Black Diamond Middle School
Dallas Ranch Middle School
Orchard Park Middle School
Park Middle School

Elementary schools
Belshaw Elementary School
Carmen Dragon Elementary School
Diablo Vista Elementary School
Fremont Elementary School
Grant Elementary School
Kimball Elementary School
London Elementary School
Lone Tree Elementary School
Marsh Elementary School
Mission Elementary School
Muir Elementary School (formerly Antioch Primary School)
Orchard Park School
Sutter Elementary School
Turner Elementary School

References

School districts in Contra Costa County, California
Antioch, California
1921 establishments in California